Gonzalo Fabián Porras Burghi (born 31 January 1984 in Montevideo) is a retired Uruguayan footballer and current sporting director of Villa Teresa.

Career

After retirement
After retiring at the end of 2020, Porras was appointed sporting director of Villa Teresa in January 2021.

References

External links

1984 births
Living people
Footballers from Montevideo
Uruguayan footballers
Association football midfielders
Uruguayan expatriate footballers
Liverpool F.C. (Montevideo) players
Juventud de Las Piedras players
Club Atlético River Plate (Montevideo) players
Danubio F.C. players
Olimpo footballers
Deportivo Toluca F.C. players
Club Nacional de Football players
C.A. Cerro players
Villa Teresa players
Uruguayan Primera División players
Uruguayan Segunda División players
Liga MX players
Argentine Primera División players
Uruguayan expatriate sportspeople in Mexico
Uruguayan expatriate sportspeople in Argentina
Expatriate footballers in Mexico
Expatriate footballers in Argentina